is a Japanese animator, character designer, illustrator and animation director. She's mostly known for her character design work for the first two seasons of the 1990s Sailor Moon anime series.

Career
Tadano first worked on as an animation director for an episode of 1980s Saint Seiya anime. She then became a character designer for Dancouga – Super Beast Machine God, and Crystal Triangle.

In the 1990s, after working on various episodes for Goldfish Warning!, she then became a character designer for the first two seasons of the Sailor Moon anime series (Sailor Moon and Sailor Moon R), she provided some animation direction for many episodes. She also provided the designs for its first movie, Sailor Moon R: The Movie.

From the late 1990s to 2000s, after Sailor Moon, she designed the characters for Wedding Peach, Petite Princess Yucie, Jūsō Kikō Dancouga Nova, Valkyria of the Battlefield 3: The Wound Taken from Someone's Sake, and Nobunagun.

In June 2018, it was announced that Tadano was chosen as a character designer for Pretty Guardian Sailor Moon Eternal The Movie, a two-part anime film project that takes place as a "fourth season" of the Pretty Guardian Sailor Moon Crystal anime series, adapting the Dream arc of the original manga (known as Dead Moon arc in Japan).

In December 2019, both Tadano and her husband, Hiromi Matsushita, were chosen as character designers for the sixth spin-off of the Yu-Gi-Oh! Duel Monsters anime series, Yu-Gi-Oh! Sevens. In December 2021, Tadano and Matsushita were chosen as character designers again for the seventh spin-off, Yu-Gi-Oh! Go Rush!!.

In April 2022, it was announced that Tadano will design the characters for Sailor Moon Eternal sequel, titled Pretty Guardian Sailor Moon Cosmos The Movie, which will cover Stars arc of the manga (known as Shadow Galactica in Japan), and will be released in 2023.

Personal life
She married Hiromi Matsushita, who was also an animation director on Sailor Moon.

Her favorite hobbies are going to karaoke, traveling, and her dislikes are exercising (though she prefers to walk).

Works

Anime

Anime Film

OVA

References

External links
 
 

Living people
Japanese animators
Japanese animated film directors
Japanese women film directors
Japanese women animators
Anime character designers
People from Hiroshima
1959 births